Kafue National Park is the largest national park in Zambia, covering an area of about 22,400 km2 (similar in size to Wales or Massachusetts). It is one of the largest parks in Africa and is home to 152 different species of mammals.

The park is named for the Kafue River. It stretches over three provinces: North Western, Central and Southern. The main access is via the Lusaka–Mongu Road from Lusaka to Mongu which crosses the park north of its centre. Seasonal dirt roads also link from Kalomo and Namwala in the south and south-east, and Kasempa in the north.

History
Kafue National Park was established in the 1950s by Norman Carr, an influential British-Rhodesian conservationist.

Establishment may have been possible after the British colonial government moved the traditional owners of the area, the Nkoya people of (King) Mwene Kabulwebulwe, from their traditional hunting grounds into the Mumbwa District to the east in 1924. Dissatisfaction with the pace of development in Central Province and a lack of benefit from tourism in the park have led to calls from Nkoya leaders to establish a new province in the area which they have proposed to call Kafue Province.

Geology and climate

The southwestern part of the Hook granite massif underlies the central part of the park, including schist, gneiss, granite-gneiss and granite. 
On the edge of the granite massif there are slates, quartzites and limestones from the Katanga sediments of the inner Lufilian Arc.
To the north and south of the massif the soil covers Karroo sediments of shales, siltstones, concreted gravels and various types of laterite.

In the northern end of the park the flood plains have clay soils, but otherwise the soils are strongly leached sandy to loamy soils with low fertility.
In most of the drainage of the Nanzila river, and in some of the lands around the Nkala, Musa and Lwansanza rivers, there are dark grey alkaline clays.
Otherwise, the park is covered by well-drained and relatively infertile pale or orange Kalahari sands mixed with some silt and clay.

The main tributaries to the Kafue river in this park are the Lufupa and Lunga rivers in the north, the Luansanza (or Lwansanza) in the centre and the Musa in the south.

Winds are mostly light, blowing from the east.

Habitats and flora
Most of the park is covered in miombo woodlands, which are open semi-deciduous forests of trees in the genera Brachystegia, Julbernardia and Isoberlinia, adapted to periodic wildfires. These woodlands have a few small dambos (grasslands which become marshy in the rainy season) interspersed among them. Large termite mounds are found in the forests, and these host their own particular evergreen floras, notably the candelabra tree (Euphorbia ingens), and the jackalberry (Diospyros mespiliformis). Large and small open plains are found throughout the park, often dotted with small termite mounds. Evergreen forests of teak and mopane occur in the south and centre. The Kafue River eventually flows into the man-made Lake Itezhi-tezhi, forming a reservoir partially within the park. An important aquatic plant is the grass Vossia cuspidata, which forms free-floating mats in the river. Aeschynomene elaphroxylon is a problematic weed near Lake Itezhi-tezhi.

The Busanga Plains in the far north-west are a well-known attraction; these are seasonally flooded grasslands along the Lufupa river. They host large herds of herbivores and much birdlife.

Fauna

Kafue National Park hosts a large range of antelopes including puku, sitatunga, red lechwe, blue duiker, yellow-backed duiker, Sharpe's grysbok, oribi, impala, roan antelope, sable antelope and hartebeest. African bush elephant herds are commonly seen. Other mammals include African buffalo, aardvark, pangolin, bushpig, warthog, spring hare and bush baby. The Kafue River and its tributaries are home to pods of hippopotamus and a few of the largest Nile crocodiles in southern Africa. There are also monitor lizards in the park. The cheetah occurs throughout this park, and the African leopard is frequently seen. The park is a stronghold of the African wild dog. Other carnivores include Selous's mongoose, white-tailed mongoose, marsh mongoose, African civet, honey badger, African clawless otter, spotted-necked otter, serval, caracal and African wild cat. 
Since 2005, the protected area has been considered a lion 'conservation unit', together with South Luangwa National Park.

Birds
There are over 500 recorded bird species. Some include Pel's fishing owl, black-cheeked lovebird, grey crowned crane, African finfoot, Böhm's bee-eaters, paradise flycatchers, sunbirds, numerous kingfisher species and Zambia's only endemic bird, Chaplin's barbet. Busanga is one of the few known breeding sites for wattled cranes. There are also flocks of pelicans, many species of egrets and large gatherings of African openbill storks. Colonies of African skimmers are found on sandbars in the main rivers.

The small termite mounds of the grasslands attract sooty chats, and wetter areas of the plains are favoured by the rosy-throated longclaw. When the termite alates fly before the rains, pallid harriers, Montagu's harriers, lesser kestrels and Eurasian hobby feast on them.

The woodlands are home to African hawk-eagles, black-chested snake-eagles, racket-tailed rollers, flocks of helmetshrikes, and sooty and Arnot's chats.

Fish
Commercially important fish species in the area are Sarotherodon macrochir, Tilapia andersonii, T. rendalli, T. sparrmanii, Clarias gariepinus, Marcusenius macrolepidotus, Labeo molybdinus and Hepsetus odoe. In 1992 kapenta (Limnothrissa miodon) from Lake Tanganyika were introduced into Lake Itezhi-tezhi.

Infrastructure
Ngoma in the south is the headquarters of the park, but this area, together with the Nanzhila Plains, is less visited since the Itezhi-Tezhi Dam was built and more lodges were developed in the north. The reservoir cut the north–south track through the park and used to make it necessary to detour outside the park to drive between Ngoma and Chunga. The completion of the spine road once again links the north and south of the park.

See also

Wildlife of Zambia

References

External links

National parks of Zambia
Geography of Central Province, Zambia
Geography of North-Western Province, Zambia
Geography of Southern Province, Zambia
Kafue River
Miombo
Protected areas established in 1924
Tourist attractions in Central Province, Zambia
Tourist attractions in North-Western Province, Zambia
Tourist attractions in Southern Province, Zambia
Important Bird Areas of Zambia
Central Zambezian miombo woodlands